Bautista Barros Schelotto (born 13 January 2000) is an Argentine professional footballer who plays as a right-back for Gimnasia La Plata.

Career
Barros Schelotto joined the Gimnasia y Esgrima youth system at the age of six. He made his reserves debut on 7 August 2017 against Chacarita Juniors under Leandro Martini. Martini later, as joint first-team manager alongside Mariano Messera, promoted Barros Schelotto into the senior squad in early January 2021. He was initially selected on the substitute's bench for Copa de la Liga Profesional matches with San Lorenzo, Unión Santa Fe and Atlético Tucumán. Barros Schelotto made his competitive debut for the club on 23 March during a Copa Argentina round of thirty-two victory over Primera C Metropolitana's Dock Sud.

Personal life
Barros Schelotto is the nephew of former footballers Guillermo and Gustavo Barros Schelotto, while cousins Juan, Salvador and Tomás Cataldi also became footballers. His father, Pablo, had a stint as a goalkeeper in Gimnasia y Esgrima's academy before taking a career in medicine, while grandfather Hugo Barros Schelotto was Gimnasia president during the 1980s.

Career statistics
.

Notes

References

External links

2000 births
Living people
Footballers from La Plata
Argentine footballers
Association football defenders
Club de Gimnasia y Esgrima La Plata footballers
Barros Schelotto/Cataldi family